"La Belle Epoque" is a song by Swedish alternative rock band Kent from their eleventh studio album, Tigerdrottningen. It was released as the album's lead single on 12 March 2014, as a digital download. It features backing vocals by singer Erik Hassle.

In an interview with Gaffa, lead singer Joakim Berg explained the song's lyrics saying, "We have become a Belle Epoque-nation pointing fingers at each other, it's your fault, it's your fault". Berg further elaborated, "A friend of mine who is a political journalist says that we have become a nation of political separatists. A bunch of small groups that are all extremely offended and do not show any understanding for each other, no one wants to reconcile, nobody wants to negotiate and no one wants to compromise.

Track listing
Digital download
"La Belle Epoque" – 3:57

7" vinyl single
"La Belle Epoque" – 3:58
"La Belle Epoque" (instrumental) – 3:58

Credits and personnel
Recording
Recorded at Conway Studios, Los Angeles, United States
Mixed at Park Studios, Stockholm, Sweden
Mastered at Sterling Sound, New York City, United States

Personnel
Joakim Berg – songwriter
Kent – producer
Daniel Alexander – producer
Stefan Boman – recording, mixer
Ryan Smith – mastering
Erik Hassle – backing vocals

Credits adapted from "La Belle Epoque" 7" vinyl liner notes.

Charts

Weekly charts

Year-end charts

Certifications

References

Kent (band) songs
2014 singles
Songs written by Joakim Berg
Swedish-language songs
2014 songs
Sonet Records singles
Universal Music Group singles